Trotsky Marudu is an Indian contemporary artist known for line drawing, animation, storyboard and computer graphics. Marudu has also worked as Art director and VFX creative director for many films and is a pioneer in using computer for painting. He holds a diploma and a post-diploma in painting from the Madras College of Arts and Crafts and his collection of paintings have been exhibited in many countries like Australia, the UK, the US, France, Finland and many parts of India.

Marudu's paintings is a blend of traditional and modern art, mostly figurative and later creeped into semi abstract figurative works. He also shifted his focus slowly into illustration, animation, digital art, photography and his passion towards comic books merged all arts into a single body. He opined that, "The gap between modern painting, illustrations and photography has been bridged, with the computer serving as an all-encompassing platform. Future artists will work like this as multimedia has become a language by itself,".

Marudu has also published many books, and 'Kaalathin Thiraicheelai', a collective collection of Tamil intellectuals view on Marudu-the person, was also published as a book.

Life and career

Early life

Marudu born in Madurai was attracted to drawing because of his father MR.Maruthappan, a Trotskyite, who encouraged him by introducing books with illustration. He was also influenced by the hand-drawn portraits of Rabindranath Tagore and Netaji Subash Chandra Bose by M. R. Acharekar, that decorated his house. He began to read and observe finer details of his surroundings by roaming the streets of Madurai and read about Salvador Dalí and Pablo Picasso when he was in seventh standard. Marudu's drawing masters Augustine and Jeyaraj nurtured him to win many prizes in competitions.

Career

Marudu's stint at Madras College of Arts and Crafts helped him to meet sculptor Dhanapal, who later became his mentor. He said, "The exposure at college pushed me to another level of understanding and helped in constantly exploring new possibilities". He was the textile designer at the Weavers Service Centre in Chennai and Vijayawada along with K. M. Adimoolam and other senior artistes. Marudu and Adimoolam took initiative in introducing contemporary art that broke all the conservative techniques in many popular magazines of that era. He was also attracted to movies because of his mother, Rukmini Maruthappan as her uncle MS.Solaimalai was a story and dialogue writer who influenced him along with actor S. S. Rajendran. Marudu was particularly attracted by Walt Disney, stop motion animation, trick shots and special effects in movies that prompted him to join as special effects as well as computer graphics coordinator for more than 30 films so far in both Tamil and Telugu languages.

Awards

Marudu won the Government of Tamil Nadu 'Best Artist' award in 1978 and the Kalaimamani award in 2007.

Books

Kodukalum Varthaikalum
Kodukalum Varthaikalum is a collection of articles about paintings.

Cartoonayanam
This book by MSS Pandiyan and VMS Subaguna Rajan with Marudu's illustration is a collection of cartoons and illustrated essay on C. N. Annadurai, Chief Minister of Tamil Nadu.

Vaalor Aadum Amalai
This book is a rare collection of paintings as well as information about Tamil kings. Marudu told that the costumes portrayed in Tamil films are derived from Marathi films and it never had anything to do with the Tamil culture, so he tried to break this myth in 'Vaalor Aadum Amalai'.

Drawings for Children
The books, Line and Circle and Look, the Moon! are special collection of paintings for children. Line and Circle has been translated into 27 languages.

Where are you going you monkeys?
Where are you going you monkeys? is a collection of folktales from Tamil Nadu written by K.Rajanarayanan with Trotsky Marudu's illustration.

Personal life

He is married to Rathinam Marudu. He lives and works in Chennai.

Filmography

References

External links
 

1953 births
Living people
Indian contemporary painters
Indian male painters
20th-century Indian painters
21st-century Indian painters
Mixed-media artists
Indian multimedia artists
Abstract painters
Indian art directors
Recipients of the Kalaimamani Award
Special effects people
Artists from Madurai
Painters from Tamil Nadu
20th-century Indian male artists
21st-century Indian male artists